Anania coronatoides is a moth in the family Crambidae. It was described by Hiroshi Inoue in 1960. It is found in Japan (Hokkaido).

References

Moths described in 1960
Pyraustinae
Moths of Japan